Sabra is a neighborhood district in western Gaza. It was established during the Mandatory Palestine period in Palestine. It contains the city's municipal mark, built in the 1930s south of Omar Mukhtar Street. Sabra is home to the Sabra family. The Israeli Air Force destroyed a small dairy factory in the neighborhood in a wave of airstrikes against the Gaza Strip on 2 April 2010.

References

Bibliography

Neighborhoods of Gaza City